The Durango Arts Center (DAC) provides Durango, Colorado and surrounding communities opportunities to create, to promote, and to participate in diverse arts experiences. The DAC brings people together to explore and engage in arts and culture by fostering creative expression through in-house exhibitions, performances, and educational programs for all ages and abilities.

The DAC strives to support a creative dialogue among community members, ensuring that culture informs local decision-making and enriches our lives.

The DAC serves as a community hub for Arts & Culture in Durango, Colorado.
—
The DAC is located at the corner of East 2nd Ave. and 8th St., in a building that was once home to a car dealership.  In 1997, the community collaborated to fund and renovate the 17,000-square-foot building, now home to a gallery, theater, arts library, studio space and more.

References

External links 
 Official website

Arts organizations based in Colorado
Durango, Colorado